Phalara was a city in Malis in ancient Thessaly that functioned as the port of Lamia. It is located at the modern town of Stylida.

References

Former populated places in Greece
Populated places in ancient Thessaly
Cities in ancient Greece
Malis (region)